Millville is an unincorporated community located in Woodford County, Kentucky.  It is situated about 5 miles (8 km) southeast of Frankfort, Kentucky.  Glenns Creek runs through the town, and it is near the Kentucky River.

Millville took its name from the many flour mills and water-powered grist mills in the area.  A post office was established in 1854, and closed in 1907.  Samuel Miles was the first postmaster.

References

Unincorporated communities in Woodford County, Kentucky
Unincorporated communities in Kentucky